Tanzania is a country with many tourist attractions. Approximately 38 percent of Tanzania's land area is set aside in protected areas for conservation. There are 17 national parks, 29 game reserves, 40 controlled conservation areas (including the Ngorongoro Conservation Area) and marine parks. Tanzania is also home to Mount Kilimanjaro, the highest point in Africa.

Travel and tourism contributed 17.5 percent of Tanzania's gross domestic product in 2016 and employed 11.0 percent of the country's labour force (1,189,300 jobs) in 2013. The sector is growing rapidly, rising from US$1.74 billion in 2004 to US$4.48 billion in 2013. In 2016, 1,284,279 tourists arrived at Tanzania's borders compared to 590,000 in 2005.

In 2019, the Tanzanian tourism sector generated US$2.6 billion in revenues with 1.5 million tourist arrivals.   

In 2020, due to Covid-19, travel receipts declined to US$1.06 billion and the number of international tourist arrivals declined to 616,491.

In October 2021, the Ministry of Natural Resources and Tourism of Tanzania has been granted TSh.90 billion/= for the financial year 2021-2022, part of the IMF loan for emergency financial assistance to support Tanzania’s efforts in responding to the Covid-19 pandemic.

Tourist attractions

National parks in tanzania 

Tanzania has almost 38% of its land reserved as protected areas, one of the world's highest percentage. Tanzania boasts 16 national parks and is home to a large variety of animal life. Among the large mammals include the Big five, cheetahs, wildebeest, giraffes, hippopotamuses and various antelopes. Tanzania's most well known wildlife attractions are located in the northern part of the country and include the Serengeti National Park, Tarangire National Park and Lake Manyara National Park. The Serengeti National park encompasses the world-famous great migrations of animals. The Serengeti National Park is the most popular park in the country and had the chance to host more than 330,000 visitors in 2012.

In 2018, Serengeti National Park was voted the best African Safari Park following the depth study conducted by SafariBookings the largest online marketplace for African safaris. In their website, it reads, In total 2,530 reviews were examined from the SafariBookings website. The 1,670 user reviews were contributed by safari tourists from 72 countries. To complement these user reviews, reputable guidebook authors (working for Lonely Planet, Rough Guides, Frommer's, Bradt and Footprint) teamed up in the SafariBookings Expert Panel to write 860 expert reviews

The north is also home to the Ngorongoro Conservation Area. The Ngorongoro Conservation Area includes the Ngorongoro Crater, which is an extinct volcanic caldera with lions, hippopotamus, elephants, various types of antelope, the endangered black rhinoceros, and large herds of wildebeest and zebra. Olduvai Gorge, considered to be the seat of humanity after the discovery of the earliest known specimens of the human genus, Homo habilis as well as early hominidae, such as Paranthropus boisei also lies within the conservation area.

The western part of Tanzania includes the Mahale, Katavi, and Gombe national parks, the latter of which is the site of Jane Goodall's ongoing study, begun in 1960, of chimpanzee behaviour. The country is also particularly rich in plant diversity, the Tanzania National Parks Authority has an entire national park the Kitulo National Park dedicated to flowers. There is a wide variety of biomass across the nation.

The Mount Kilimanjaro

Also known as the roof of Africa, Mount Kilimanjaro is a UNESCO World Heritage site and the highest peak in Africa. The mountain (now a dormant volcano) rises approximately 4,877 metres (16,001 ft) from its base to 5,895 metres (19,341 ft) above sea level. The mountain is located in the north of the country on the border with Kenya in the town of Moshi and is accessible via Kilimanjaro International Airport. The airport also provides a gateway for tourists to all northern safari circuits. The mountain is part of Kilimanjaro National Park and is the second most popular park in the country and roughly 20,000 visitors trek the mountain every year. The mountain is one of the most accessible high peaks in the world and has an average success rate of around 65%.

Zanzibar

UNESCO World Heritage Sites

Tanzania is home to seven UNESCO World Heritage sites with 6 of them on the mainland and 1 in Zanzibar. Currently there are 5 more sites viable to be nominated such as the Gombe National Park and the East African slave trade route.

Visa policy

Most visitors to Tanzania must obtain a visa from one of the Tanzanian diplomatic missions. However, a majority of nations can obtain a visitor visa at any port of entry land or air. Most SADC citizens or East African Community citizens do not need a visa for tourism purposes. 3-month tourist visas are available for US$50 at all ports of entry (except US citizens must buy US$100 1 year multiple entry visas). Tanzania does not fall under the East African Tourist Visa regime and a separate visa is required to enter Tanzania. All visitors must hold a passport valid for 6 months (according to the Tanzanian immigration department) or a month beyond the period of intended stay (according to IATA).

Statistics

In 2014 a total of 1,093,000 tourists visited Tanzania continuing the year on year growth of visitors. Compared to the size and potential Tanzania has the second lowest number of tourists only above Burundi. Almost 50% of tourists into were from Africa and the number has been rising due to the increase in regional integration and improved flight connectivity. Though the industry has been continually growing the recent recession and the 2014 Ebola scare has hurt the industry heavily.

Tourist arrivals by year

Arrivals by country

See also
 Ministry of Natural Resources and Tourism
 Visa policy of Tanzania

References

External links

Government ministries and agencies
 Ministry of Natural Resources and Tourism
 Ngorongoro Conservation Area Authority
 Tanzania Tourist Board
 Tanzania Cultural Tourism Programme
 Tanzania National Parks

 
Tanzania